Rangalifinolhu is one of the uninhabited islands of Alif Dhaal Atoll.

A smaller adjoining island (Rangali) is linked by a 500-metre footbridge. Both islands are currently occupied by Conrad Maldives Resort & Spa.

Uninhabited islands of the Maldives